The 1872 Southern West Riding of Yorkshire by-election was held on 8 July 1872.  The byelection was fought due to the resignation of the incumbent Liberal MP, Viscount Milton.  It was won by the Conservative candidate Walter Spencer-Stanhope, who was unopposed.  The Conservatives retained this gain at the 1874 general election.

References

Southern West Riding of Yorkshire by-election
Southern West Riding of Yorkshire by-election
Southern West Riding of Yorkshire by-election
By-elections to the Parliament of the United Kingdom in Yorkshire and the Humber constituencies
Unopposed by-elections to the Parliament of the United Kingdom in English constituencies
19th century in Yorkshire